The Society of Christian Doctrine (abbreviated SDC), better known as MUSEUM, is a society of Catholic lay volunteers, made of men and women, teaching catechism in the Christian faith formation of children and adults. The society was established by George Preca in March 1907, in Malta. It has eventually spread around the world, first among Maltese migrants in Australia, then in Albania, in North Sudan, and other countries.

Name

MUSEUM is the abbreviation for "Magister Utinam Sequatur Evangelium Universus Mundus" as meaning "Master if only the whole world would follow the Gospel."

Centres

In Malta, the society has forty-six catechism centres for males and forty-three for females.

It took until 1961 for the society to spread in Gozo, and was successful after a visit for a fishing session. That same year catechism started for males, and in 1962 it was followed by the female branch. There are now nine catechism centres for males and seven for females in Gozo.

The objectives of the religious society is catechetical work in the parishes. Members may participate in the activities in six days every week. The society often organises recreational activities for minors and educational courses for adults.

Members of the society are invited to participate for a meeting every Wednesday at the mother-house of the society, in Blata l-Bajda, Marsa. The mother-house is the prominent Church of Our Lady of the Miraculous Medal. The main scope for teaching catechism is to religiously prepare individuals, generally minors, to receive the sacraments according to the Roman Catholic tradition.

Superior Generals

This is a list of former and present superior generals of the society:

 Eugenio Borg (1911–1967);
 Francesco Saliba (1967–1983);
 Victor Delicata (1983–2009) and
 Natalino Camilleri (2009–2021)
 Roberto Zammit (2021-present)

Further reading
History of the society:

 Information from

See also
Żgħażagħ Azzjoni Kattolika
 Religion in Malta

References

Catholic Church in Malta
Christian organizations established in 1907
Catholic lay organisations
Catholic religious orders established in the 20th century
1907 establishments in Malta
Religious organisations based in Malta